Breaza is a commune located in Suceava County, Romania. It is composed of three villages: Breaza, Breaza de Sus and Pârâu Negrei.

The commune shares its name with Breaza, Prahova County, its name being derived from a Slavic word, breza, meaning "birch tree". Inhabited by a majority of Ukrainians up to the 1930s, the ethnicity and language of all its inhabitants are today reported as Romanian.

Breaza is located at a distance of 359 km north of Bucharest, 69 km west of Suceava.

Population
The commune includes the following villages:

 Breaza (1159 inhabitants)
 Breaza de Sus (333 inhabitants)
 Pârâu Negrei (198 inhabitants)

According to the 2002 census, there were 1,690 people living in the commune, all of them Romanians. According to the 2011 census, 98.88% are Romanians and 0.86% of unknown ethnicity. All the inhabitants of the commune called Romanian their native language. As a result of Romanization, the national composition of the commune changed dramatically compared to 1930 (60.03% of Ruthenians, 5.95% of Jews, 1.08% of Russians, 0.7% of Germans, 0.06% of Poles, and 32.13% of Romanians). In the 1930 census, Ruthenians (Ukrainians) and Russians were counted separately.

As of religion, the composition of the population of the commune today is: 99.1% Orthodox, 0.7% Adventeists, 0.2% Pentecostals.

References

Communes in Suceava County
Localities in Southern Bukovina
Ukrainian communities in Romania